Blenheim is the most populous town in the region of Marlborough, in the north east of the South Island of New Zealand. It has an urban population of  The surrounding Marlborough wine region is well known as the centre of the New Zealand wine industry. It enjoys one of New Zealand's sunniest climates, with warm, relatively dry summers and cool, crisp winters.

Blenheim is named after the Battle of Blenheim (1704), where troops led by John Churchill, 1st Duke of Marlborough defeated a combined French and Bavarian force.

History

The sheltered coastal bays of Marlborough supported a small Māori population possibly as early as the 12th century. Archaeological evidence dates Polynesian human remains uncovered at Wairau Bar to the 13th century. The rich sea and bird life of the area would easily have supported such small communities. As the Māori population of the area increased, they developed the land to sustain the growing population. In the early 1700s canals and waterways were dug among the natural river courses, allowing for the first forms of farming in the area including that of fish and native water fowl. A total of approximately 18 km of channels are known to have been excavated before the arrival of European settlers. Māori in the Marlborough Region also cultivated crops, including kumara (sweet potato).

The area is also home to the first serious clash of arms between Māori and the British settlers after the signing of the Treaty of Waitangi. The Wairau Affray which occurred in what is now the village of Tuamarina.

The settlement was originally known to Europeans as The Beaver or Beaverton due to its frequent flooding.

Although the early history of Marlborough was closely associated with the Nelson settlement, the people of Marlborough desired independence from Nelson. In 1859, nineteen years after the original Nelson settlement, the request of Marlborough settlers was granted, and Marlborough became a separate province. Although gold was discovered in the province in the early 1860s the resulting boom did not last, and while the gold rush helped to expand the region, it was the development of pastoralism which provided the greatest long-term benefits. Marlborough squatters developed huge sheep runs that dominated the countryside, rivalling Canterbury's sheep stations in size and wealth.

Geography

Situated on the Wairau Plain, the town is mostly flat with only its southernmost fringe rising to the base of the Wither Hills. As the plain is surrounded by mountains on all but the eastern flank, which is open to Cook Strait, it is relatively well protected from the frequent southerly weather fronts occurring during winters. The area does however experience some high wind events during the course of the year, especially from the west where the wind is funnelled down the Wairau Valley directly at the town. Open and exposed areas in and around Blenheim are also hit quite hard by winds blowing inland from Cook Strait. 
Blenheim sits at the confluence of the Taylor and Ōpaoa rivers. It is in a tectonically active zone and experiences several (usually small) earthquakes each year. The boundary between the Pacific plate (on which Blenheim sits) and the Indo-Australian plate passes just north of Blenheim. It lies east of Renwick, and just south of Spring Creek.

Climate
The climate is generally very settled, largely due to the rain shadow effect of the mountain ranges to the west which shelter Blenheim from the heaviest of rains that hit the western part of the South Island.

Summers are typically warm and dry while winters are normally cool and frosty with clear sunny days that follow.  Snowfall is rare as it is sheltered from cold southerly weather by the mountain ranges to the south.

Thunderstorms are an uncommon occurrence due to the sheltered climate. There is a higher likelihood in summer, when afternoon heating can generate a buildup of clouds above the ranges.

The highest recorded temperature is 37.8C, Recorded on 7 February 1973. The lowest is −8.8C.

Demographics

The Blenheim urban area had a usual resident population of 26,832 at the 2018 New Zealand census, an increase of 2,220 people (9.0%) since the 2013 census, and an increase of 3,138 people (13.2%) since the 2006 census. There were 13,056 males and 13,779 females, giving a sex ratio of 0.95 males per female. Of the total population, 4,677 people (17.4%) were aged up to 15 years, 4,461 (16.6%) were 15 to 29, 11,526 (43.0%) were 30 to 64, and 6,168 (23.0%) were 65 or older.

Ethnicities were 85.3% European/Pākehā, 13.7% Māori, 3.9% Pacific peoples, 5.6% Asian, and 2.6% other ethnicities (totals add to more than 100% since people could identify with multiple ethnicities).

Suburbs

 Inner suburbs:
 Blenheim CBD
 Burleigh
 Farnham
 Islington
 Mayfield
 Redwoodtown
 Riversdale
 Roselands
 Solar Heights
 Springlands
 St Andrews
 Witherlea
 Wither Hills
 Wither Rise
 Yelverton

 Outer suburbs:
 Fairhall
 Grovetown
 Omaka
 Renwick
 Riverlands
 Spring Creek
 Woodbourne

Economy
The region's economy is rurally based with pastoral and horticultural farming providing a major source of income. The modern inhabitants, as their forebearers, continue to utilise the marine resources available. Lake Grassmere is the country's only salt works, producing 50% of its total salt requirement. Fishing and mussel farming are also extremely important in the region. Olive growing has also become popular in recent years.

Wine

Viticulture also has a very large impact on the local economy both directly, by way of employment and servicing required, and also by way of 'wine tourism'. The local cellars attracted hundreds of thousands of domestic and international tourists every year. The area also hosts the annual Marlborough Wine & Food Festival. The Marlborough wine region is now New Zealand's largest, and receives worldwide recognition for its Sauvignon Blanc wines.

With its growing international critical recognition, much of the Marlborough wine industry has come to be dominated by large firms, owned by major New Zealand companies or offshore investors. There are over 50 vineyards near Blenheim. Agricultural land prices in the Wairau Valley increased dramatically in the 1990s and 2000s.

Lifestyle
The sunny, pleasant climate has long attracted people to the region, as holiday-makers or as permanent settlers. The region is especially popular among retired people, as well as people seeking an alternative lifestyle. Rapid population growth and other factors though have led to a contemporary chronic shortage of affordable housing for low and middle income earners.

The Marlborough Region has a wide range of predominantly outdoor leisure activities and the relaxed lifestyle and the flourishing wine and gourmet food industry in Marlborough are enjoyed by both locals and visitors alike.

Events and points of interest

Omaka Aerodrome, south of the town centre, is the setting for the two-yearly Classic Fighters Marlborough airshow. With a large emphasis on aircraft of World War One, it has been held since 2001.

Seymour Square and Pollard Park are two of the town centres main attractions for walks and general tourism. Seymour Square is an open public area in the centre, containing the War Memorial and Clock Tower, unveiled in 1928, classified as a "Category I" ("places of 'special or outstanding historical or cultural heritage significance or value'") historic place by Heritage New Zealand. The Square was named after Henry Seymour. Pollard Park is a large public park including children's play areas, native shrubbery, rose gardens, a landscaped waterway, and is home to the Blenheim Golf Club and its 9-hole course, the Marlborough Tennis club and its courts, and Blenheim Croquet Club.
They are dry and arid ranges which have previously been the site of severe grass fires.

The GCSB Waihopai communications monitoring facility, part of the ECHELON network, is near Blenheim.

Transport

Air
Woodbourne Airport is a domestic airport and an RNZAF operational base. There are direct flights from Auckland and Wellington with Air New Zealand and from Wellington, Christchurch, and Paraparaumu with Sounds Air.

Omaka Aerodrome, to the south of the town centre, is used solely by private and vintage aircraft. The Classic Fighters airshow (based mainly on World War I and II aircraft) is held biennially at Easter.

Road
State Highway 1 runs through Blenheim and  terminates at the junction of the two state highways. Blenheim is notable for a town of its size in that it does not have traffic lights at any intersection. Instead, roundabouts speed arterial traffic flow. Since the installation of roundabouts traffic volumes have quickly increased and upgrading options are being considered, e.g. traffic lights, longer two-lane approaches and even a bypass.

Rail
Blenheim is on the Main North Line, the northern part of the unofficially-named South Island Main Trunk Railway. The Coastal Pacific, a long-distance passenger train between Picton and Christchurch, stops at Blenheim Railway Station. The 1906 station has been listed NZHPT Category II since 1982. It is a standard Vintage station, with Tudor half-timbering and tile.

A major rail freight facility is north of Blenheim at Spring Creek.

The narrow-gauge Blenheim Riverside Railway runs through the town.

Infrastructure and services

Electricity
The Marlborough Electric Power Board (MEPB) was formed in October 1923 and established the Blenheim's first public supply in April 1927, following the commissioning of the Waihopai hydroelectric power station 40 km southwest of Blenheim. Two diesel generators were commissioned at Springlands in 1930 and 1937 to supplement the supply from Waihopai. The town was connected to Cobb Power Station in 1945, which in turn was connected to the rest of the South Island grid in 1956. The diesel generators were relegated to standby duty, last generated power on 22 July 1992, and were decommissioned in 2003. The Energy Companies Act 1992 saw the MEPB corporatised and renamed Marlborough Electric. The 1998 electricity sector reforms required electricity companies to separate their lines and supply businesses. Marlborough Electric sold its generation and retailing business to Trustpower, with the remaining lines business renamed Marlborough Lines.

Today, Marlborough Lines owns and operates the electricity distribution network servicing the town, with electricity fed from Transpower's national grid at its Blenheim substation in Springlands.

Water supply and sanitation 
Blenheim's water supply is drawn from the Wairau aquifer via nine bores and is treated at two plants in Middle Renwick Road and Bomford Street.

Education
The first school opened in 1859. By 1875 there were three classes: Blenheim Upper Boys', Blenheim Lower Boys', and Blenheim Girls' and Infants'. Blenheim High School was formed within the school in 1879.

Catholic schools for boys and girls were established in 1872, replaced by St Mary's Boys' school in 1886. In 1929 St Mary's was rebuilt after a fire.

Marlborough High School, a coeducational secondary school, was founded in Blenheim in 1900. In 1919 it changed its name to Marlborough College. The intermediate section was split to form Bohally Intermediate in 1956. The college was split into separate boys' and girls' schools in 1963, with Marlborough Boys' College (MBC) retaining the existing site and Marlborough Girls' College (MGC) moving to a new site. The intention to relocate both Marlborough Boys' College and Marlborough Girls' College on the site currently occupied by MGC and Bohally Intermediate was announced in 2019. Bohally Intermediate will relocate to the current MBC site on Stephenson Street.

There are currently 11 schools in the Blenheim urban area: 
Blenheim School is a state contributing primary (Year 1-6) primary school.
Bohally Intermediate is a state intermediate (Year 7–8) school opened in 1957 following a split from Marlborough College.
Marlborough Boys' College is a state boys' secondary (Year 9–13) school.
Marlborough Girls' College is a state girls' secondary (Year 9–13) school.
Mayfield School is a state contributing primary (Year 1-6) school in Mayfield.
Redwoodtown School is a state full primary (Year 1-8) school in Redwoodtown.
Richmond View School is a state-integrated Christian composite (Year 1-13) school in Redwoodtown.
Springlands School is a state contributing primary (Year 1-6) school in Springlands.
St Mary's School is a state-integrated Catholic full primary (Years 1-8) school.
Whitney Street School  is a state contributing primary (Year 1-6) primary school.
Witherlea School  is a state contributing primary (Year 1-6) primary school in Witherlea.

Other primary schools are in the surrounding localities of Renwick, Fairhall, Grovetown, Rapaura and Riverlands.

The Nelson Marlborough Institute of Technology has a campus in Blenheim.

Media

Print 
Blenheim is served by a variety of print publications. The major daily newspaper serving the area is The Marlborough Express published by Fairfax NZ, with its headquarters in Blenheim. The Saturday Express and Midweek are community newspapers published by the same company and distributed throughout Marlborough.
The Blenheim Sun is a twice-weekly free newspaper distributed each Wednesday and Friday while the locally owned Marlborough Weekly is published every Tuesday and delivered to every home in the region.

Radio 
Blenheim is served by 22 FM radio stations. The town can also receive AM and FM radio stations from Wellington, due to the straight line-of-sight across Cook Strait and the high power of the transmitters.

Notable people

Bob Bell (politician)
Rosina Buckman, opera singer
Charles Burns (doctor)
Frank Devine, editor and journalist
Jim Eyles, archeologist 
William Girling, member of Parliament
Greg Hegglun, cricketer
Cameron Howieson, footballer
Jamie Joseph, rugby union player
Elizabeth Lissaman, potter
Leon MacDonald, rugby union player
Jack Macdonald (sportsman), rower
Ben May (rugby union), rugby union player
Liam Messam, rugby union player
John Newton (poet)
Ben O'Keeffe, rugby union referee
Humphrey O'Leary, Chief Justice of New Zealand
Sam Prattley, rugby union player
Vernon Redwood, member of the Queensland Legislative Assembly
Callum Saunders (cyclist)
Charles Saunders (rower)
Ben Sigmund, footballer
Robin Slow, artist
Alan Sutherland, rugby union player
David Teece, organizational economist and professor
Ian Wedde, author
Richard Wild (judge), Chief Justice of New Zealand
Michael Wintringham, State Services Commissioner

References
Bibliography
 
Notes

External links

 Marlborough District Council
 Blenheim i-Site Visitor Information Centre

 
Former provincial capitals of New Zealand